Élite Motorsport is an Italian auto racing team based in Brescia, Italy. The team has raced in the Italian Touring Car Championship and also in Touring Car Endurance Series and Rally Race.

History
The team has participated in various championships of touring car and also in Rally races. In 2019 he participated in the main national touring car championships including the TCR Italy Touring Car Championship and TCR DSG Endurance.
In 2020 the team announced its participation in the TCR Italy Touring Car Championship and TCR DSG Endurance Europe.

References

External links
 

Italian auto racing teams